Events from the year 1978 in South Korea.

Incumbents
President: Park Chung-hee 
Prime Minister: Choi Kyu-hah

Events

Births
 3 February - Chae Ri-na, singer
 7 February - Jeong Hyeong-don, comedian and television host
 24 February - Gary, rapper, songwriter, record producer, entrepreneur, and television personality
 3 March - Seomoon Tak, rock singer
 14 March - Moon Hee-joon, singer-songwriter
 5 April - Sohyang, singer
 6 April - Chun Myung-hoon, singer, rapper, actor and television presenter
 8 May - Jang Woo-hyuk, singer and rapper
 2 June - Yi So-yeon, astronaut and biotechnologist
 7 June - Tony An, singer
 8 June - Eun Ji-won, rapper and singer
 1 July - Woo Sun-hee, handball player
 25 August - Jo Jung-chi, singer-songwriter
 10 December - Chae Yeon, singer
 20 December - Yoon Gye-sang, actor and singer

See also
List of South Korean films of 1978
Years in Japan
Years in North Korea

References

 
South Korea
Years of the 20th century in South Korea
1970s in South Korea
South Korea